Arcangelo Salimbeni (circa 1536 –1579) was an Italian painter of the Renaissance period active in his native Siena, Italy. He was the father of the painter Ventura Salimbeni, stepfather of Francesco Vanni, and son of Leonardo. He was a follower of Domenico Beccafumi and Il Sodoma, and influenced by Federico Zuccaro. He painted in a delicate, often diaphonous Mannerist style.

References

1530s births
1579 deaths
16th-century Italian painters
Italian male painters
Painters from Siena
Italian Mannerist painters